A Shanghai pedicure is a type of pedicure. The pedicure involves soaking feet in hot water and using scalpels to remove dead skin, calluses, corns, and ingrown nails from the feet. This style of pedicure utilizes Chinese medicine.

References

Nail care
Foot
Traditional Chinese medicine